Killeenadeema is a civil parish in County Galway, Ireland. It contains most of the Derrybrien mountains, which hold the Derrybrien Wind Farm.

Name

The name in Irish is Chillín a Díoma, where cillín means "little church".
Thus, it means "Chapel of Díoma".

Location

Killeenadeema is in the barony of Loughrea in County Galway, Ireland.
The town of Loughrea lies on the north shore of Lough Rea, a lake.
Killeenadeema includes the southern part of Lough Rea and extends south to the border with County Clare.
It contains the Derrybrien Wind Farm.
The R353 road crosses the southern part of the parish, running through Derrybrien.

Adjoining parishes are Ardrahan, Ballynakill (Leitrim barony), Feakle (Clare), Kilchreest, Kilconickny, Killinan, Kilteskill, Kilthomas and Loughrea.

Church

The corresponding Catholic parish is in the Diocese of Clonfert.
Saint Dympna's Church was built around 1830 with a single-bay nave and transepts.
In 1920 a shallow canted single-bay apse was added.
It is built of limestone, with pitched slate roofs.
The interior has a timber battened ceiling, a carved timber gallery, marble altar furniture and signed stained glass windows by Harry Clarke.
The church is set in a graveyard with many 18th- and 19th-century gravestones, surrounded by a rubble limestone boundary wall.

Parish in 1837

According to Samuel Lewis in his Topographical Dictionary of Ireland (1837),

Notable people
Notable people associated with Killeenadeema include:

 Tony Cummins (1906– 2010), priest and centenarian born in the parish
 Seán Cunningham (1918–1997), Irish cooperative activist and Republican born in the parish
 John Fahy (1893–1969), Irish priest, republican, agrarian and radical
 Kevin Hardiman, special Olympian native of Aille, Killeenadeema, Loughrea
 John Bernard Hynes (1897–1970), mayor of Boston, from a family from the parish
 Edmond MacHugo, 16th-.century Irish Chief who resided at Killeenadeema castle, now destroyed
 Peter Kelly (1847–1908), president of the Gaelic Athletic Association in the late 1880s
 P. J. Kelly (1843–1908), Fenian

Notes

Citations

Sources

Civil parishes of County Galway